Scott Guyton (born 11 June 1976) is a New Zealand former professional cyclist, who currently works as the directeur sportif and general manager of UCI Continental team . Guyton competed at the 1996 Summer Olympics in Atlanta, in the men's individual road race, and at the 2000 Summer Olympics in Sydney, in the men's individual road race.

Major results
1998
 1st Overall Tour of Southland
 1st GP du Printemps
 9th Overall Herald Sun Tour
2000
 3rd Ronde van Midden Brabant
2001
 1st Auckland 1000/TelstraClear Challenge
 2nd Time trial, National Road Championships
 8th Overall Tour of Japan
 10th Brussel-Ingooigem
 10th Kampioenschap van Vlaanderen
2002
 1st Stage 10 Tour of Southland
2003
 1st Overall Tour of Southland
1st Stage 8
 3rd Overall Herald Sun Tour
1st Stage 13
2004
 1st Stage 1 (TTT) Tour of Southland
 1st K2 Classic

References

External links

1976 births
Living people
New Zealand male cyclists
Olympic cyclists of New Zealand
Cyclists at the 1996 Summer Olympics
Cyclists at the 2000 Summer Olympics